Cavalier Aircraft Corporation was a Sarasota, Florida, aircraft manufacturing, sales, and maintenance company whose most famous products were refurbished P-51D Mustangs known as "Cavalier Mustangs."

Origins
The company was originally formed in 1957 by Florida newspaperman David Lindsay (1922–2009) and named Trans Florida Aviation. Trans Florida specialized in modifying surplus North American P-51 Mustangs into plush business aircraft called Executive Mustangs. Later, the aircraft were renamed Cavalier Mustangs and were produced in several different versions: Cavalier 750, 1500, and 2000 (the numbers indicating the approximate range of the aircraft in statute miles). Trans Florida marketed and sold these aircraft, trained the new owners to fly them, and maintained them for customers after purchase. Lindsay also accumulated an immense stockpile of P-51 spare parts and sold these to Mustang owners worldwide. Many of the spares and entire aircraft were purchased from scrap dealers intending to melt them down.

The original builder of the Mustang, North American Aviation, purchased two Cavaliers for famed test pilot R.A. "Bob" Hoover, one in 1962 and the other in 1971 to use to promote the NAA name at airshows.

In 1967 the company was renamed Cavalier Aircraft Corporation due to the strong product identity of the Cavalier Mustang.

Military contracts
In 1965 the company was contracted in by the government of the Dominican Republic, with US State Dept. approval, to inspect and perform necessary repairs to 36 aircraft in Sarasota. In 1967 the Air Force contracted with Cavalier to create military-capable Cavalier Mustangs that would be provided to friendly countries as part of the U.S. Military Assistance Program. These aircraft were called the Cavalier F-51D Mustang, and the Cavalier TF-51D Mustang. Cavaliers of these types were supplied between 1967 and 1969, via the Air Force, to Bolivia, and directly to El Salvador, with spare parts and maintenance assistance also provided to Guatemala. Cavaliers were also constructed for Indonesia as part of a similar U.S. Military Assistance Program, called Peace Pony, in 1971 by Field Services, Inc.

The Enforcer
In 1968, Cavalier owner/founder David Lindsay began developing a highly modified version of the Cavalier Mustang ll for use as a counterinsurgency aircraft called the Enforcer. Despite Cavalier's best efforts, they were unable to secure a government purchase of the aircraft. Due to the limited manufacturing capabilities of Cavalier Aircraft Corporation, Lindsay sold the Enforcer project to Piper in late 1970. Cavalier was closed in 1971 so the founder/owner, David Lindsay, could help continue develop the Enforcer concept with Piper Aircraft into the PA-48 Enforcer.

Today
Many of the civilian Cavalier conversions are still flying today. Several of the military Cavaliers have been re-imported to the US. Most have been restored to appear as WW II or Korean era P-51s, but retain many of their Cavalier improvements.

References

External links
 Cavalier P-51 Architect Lindsay dies at 86
 Outsider David Lindsay May Have Built a Better Fighter, but the (Air) Force Is Not with Him

Defunct aircraft manufacturers of the United States
Vehicle manufacturing companies established in 1957
Vehicle manufacturing companies disestablished in 1971
1957 establishments in Florida
1971 disestablishments in Florida